The Pueblo Dodgers were a Class A minor league baseball team that was located in Pueblo, Colorado and played in the Western League from 1947 to 1958.

History

An affiliate of the Brooklyn/Los Angeles Dodgers (1947-1957 and the Chicago Cubs (1958), Pueblo won Western League Championships in 1947 and 1949. The franchise folded when the Western League dissolved in 1959.

Ballparks

The Dodgers played at a stadium called "County Park" in 1948 with the name changed to "Runyon Field" in 1948. Today it is known as Hobbs Field, within the Runyon Sports Complex.

Notable alumni

Hall of Fame Alumni

 Walter Alston (Player/MGR, 1948) Inducted 1976

 Sparky Anderson (1954) Inducted, 2000

 Billy Williams (1958) Inducted, 1987

Notable Alumni

 George Altman (1958) 3 x MLB All-Star

 Roger Craig (1954)

 Don Demeter (1955)

 Roy Face (1950) 6 x MLB All-Star

 Jim Gentile (1953-1954)  6 x MLB All-Star; 1961 AL RBI Leader

 Billy Hunter (1952) MLB All-Star

 Clem Labine (1948) 2 x MLB All-Star

 Bob Lillis (1951)

 John Roseboro (1955) 6 x MLB All-Star

 Larry Sherry (1956) 1959 World Series: Most Valuable Player

 Dave Stenhouse (1958) 2 x MLB All-Star

 Maury Wills (1953, 1956) 7 x MLB All-Star; 6 x NL Stolen Base Leader; 1962 NL Most Valuable Player

References

External links
Baseball Reference
Western League team chart

Defunct minor league baseball teams
Brooklyn Dodgers minor league affiliates
Chicago Cubs minor league affiliates
Defunct baseball teams in Colorado
Defunct Western League teams
Baseball teams disestablished in 1958
Baseball teams established in 1947